Gratitude is Gratitude's first and only album. It was released on March 8, 2005 on Atlantic Records.

Recording
Vocalist Jonah Matranga commented on the recording:

The album features several guest drummers.

Track listing

Personnel
 Bobby Lindsey - bass guitar
 Dave Jarnstrom - drums
 Jonah Matranga - vocals, acoustic guitar
 Jeremy Tappero - guitar
 Mark Weinberg - guitar

Additional musicians
 Kenny Aronoff - drums (2, 6, 10, 11)
 Thomas Becker - drums (1, 5, 7, 9, 13)
 Matt Chamberlain - drums (3, 4, 8, 12)
 Don Heffington - percussion (except 5)
 Greg Leisz - pedal steel guitar (4, 8)
 Patrick Warren - keyboards (4, 6, 9-12)

References

2005 debut albums
Gratitude (band) albums
Albums produced by Jim Scott (producer)
Atlantic Records albums